The Zala is a river in south-western Hungary. Its source is in the hills northwest of Szalafő near the borders with Austria and Slovenia. Several smaller rivers feed into it, including the Felső-Válicka, Szentmihályfalvai patak (brook), Szévíz csatorna (channel), Foglár csatorna on the right bank, and Szentjakabi patak, Sárvíz (Zala) patak, Széplaki patak, Csörgető patak and Nádas patak on the left bank. It flows through the city of Zalaegerszeg before flowing into Lake Balaton near Keszthely. The River Zala flows through the Hungarian counties of Vas and Zala.

See also
Watermills on Zala River

References

External links

Rivers of Hungary
Geography of Vas County
Geography of Zala County